Carlyle "Kyle" Hendricks (born 12 December 1986) is a South African rugby union player, who most recently played with the . His regular position is winger or fullback.

Career

Falcons

Hendricks was included in the  squad for the 2009 Vodacom Cup.

He returned to the Vodacom Cup side during the 2010 season, starting four of their matches. He also scored two tries in the ' match against , despite his side being on the wrong end of a 60–12 defeat.

Hendricks increased his points contribution the following season when he also took over the kicking duties. He scored 56 points in eight appearances for the Falcons in the 2011 Vodacom Cup, the tenth-highest in the competition and easily the Falcons' top scorer with Cronjé the next best points scorer with 20 points. He got a further 54 points during the 2011 Currie Cup First Division competition, scoring nine tries amongst his 54 points in 11 appearances.

Two tries in five appearances followed during the 2012 Vodacom Cup competition and he made just one appearance in the 2012 Currie Cup First Division season before an injury ruled him out for the remainder of the campaign. He returned during the 2013 Vodacom Cup, scoring one try in six starts before a haul of 32 points in fourteen appearances was not enough to prevent his side finishing bottom of the log during the 2013 Currie Cup First Division.

References

South African rugby union players
Living people
1986 births
Rugby union fullbacks
Rugby union wings
Rugby union players from Cape Town
Falcons (rugby union) players